Johan Bardoul (born 16 June 1987) is a New Zealand rugby union player who currently plays as a loose forward for the Coca-Cola Red Sparks in the Top Challenge League. Despite a long and illustrious career Johan still maintains a desire to represent Te Awamutu Sports as the pinnacle of Waikato club rugby

Career

The Steamers were relegated from the ITM Cup Premier Division in 2013 and then finished bottom of the Championship the following year, however Bardoul's own personal performances were strong. He was called up to the Chiefs wider training group towards the end of the 2013 Super Rugby season to cover for the injured Michael Leitch and won a full-time contract in 2015.

References

1987 births
Living people
New Zealand rugby union players
Rugby union flankers
Rugby union number eights
Bay of Plenty rugby union players
Waikato rugby union players
Chiefs (rugby union) players
Shizuoka Blue Revs players
New Zealand expatriate rugby union players
New Zealand expatriate sportspeople in Japan
Expatriate rugby union players in Japan
Coca-Cola Red Sparks players
Western Force players
Rugby union players from Waikato
People from Te Awamutu